David McNulty (born 1970) has been the National Lead Coach at British Swimming’s National Centre Bath, Somerset during the last 3 Olympic Games cycles. He briefly served in an interim capacity as British Swimming’s head coach in 2012. British Swimming fields Great Britain’s Olympic Swim Team. McNulty has coached several of Team Great Britain’s swimmers to Olympic medals. He was a 2012 joint winner of the British Swimming Association Award for Coaching Excellence.

Career
A former competitive swimmer born in County Durham, McNulty coached Great Britain’s Joanne Jackson (swimmer) to an Olympic bronze medal at the 2008 Summer Olympics in Beijing and Britain’s Michael Jamieson to an Olympic silver medal at the 2012 Summer Olympics in London. He coached Jazz Carlin (2), Siobhan-Marie O'Connor (1) and Chris Walker-Hebborn (1) to 4 Olympic silver medals at the 2016 Summer Olympics in Rio de Janeiro.

References

External links
 Telegraph video of McNulty interviewed while training athletes, titled “Team GB coach Dave McNulty on how to become an elite swimmer”

1970 births
Living people
Sportspeople from County Durham
British Olympic coaches
English swimming coaches